Sukhjinder Singh Randhawa (born 1 February 1959) is an Indian politician who was the Deputy Chief Minister of Punjab. He is also a member of Indian National Congress and Member of Punjab Legislative Assembly (MLA) and represents Dera Baba Nanak.

Early life
Sukhjinder Singh was born on 1 February 1959 at Dharowali village, tehsil Dera Baba Nanak in Gurdaspur district. His father's name is Santokh Singh who served as Punjab congress chief twice and was one of the most senior congressmen in his time. Sukhjinder completed his Matric education from Government school Chandigarh in 1975.

Political career
Randhawa first successfully contested Punjab Legislative Assembly from Fatehgarh Churian in 2002 defeating Akali dal's Nirmal Singh Kahlon. In 2012, he was elected from new constituency Dera Baba Nanak. He was one of the 42 INC MLAs who submitted their resignation in protest as part of their decision of the Supreme Court of India ruling Punjab's termination of the Sutlej-Yamuna Link (SYL) water canal unconstitutional.

Member of Legislative Assembly
He represents the Dera Baba Nanak Assembly constituency as MLA in Punjab Assembly. The Aam Aadmi Party gained a strong 79% majority in the sixteenth Punjab Legislative Assembly by winning 92 out of 117 seats in the 2022 Punjab Legislative Assembly election. MP Bhagwant Mann was sworn in as Chief Minister on 16 March 2022.

Committee assignments of Punjab Legislative Assembly
Member (2022–23) Committee on Estimates

Electoral performance

References 

Living people
1959 births
Punjab, India MLAs 2002–2007
Punjab, India MLAs 2012–2017
Punjab, India MLAs 2017–2022
Punjab, India MLAs 2022–2027
Indian National Congress politicians
People from Gurdaspur district
Punjabi people
Home Ministers of Punjab, India